Onaga USD 322 is a public unified school district headquartered in Onaga, Kansas, United States.  The district includes the communities of Onaga, Havensville, Wheaton, Duluth, Saint Clere, and nearby rural areas.

Schools
The school district operates the following schools in a conglomerate of connected buildings:
 Onaga Senior High School
 Onaga Junior High School
 Onaga Grade School

See also
 Kansas State Department of Education
 Kansas State High School Activities Association
 List of high schools in Kansas
 List of unified school districts in Kansas

References

External links
 

School districts in Kansas